Phytoecia latepubens is a species of beetle in the family Cerambycidae. It was described by Maurice Pic in 1926, originally under the genus Helladia. It is known from Syria. It contains the varietas Phytoecia latepubens var. alepensis.

References

Phytoecia
Beetles described in 1926